The Imperial Inspectorate Organization was an organization of the Iranian Pahlavi government established in 1959 to handle complaints from the public about government officials and agencies. The organization reported directly to the Shah, and was initially headed by General Hossein Fardoust, a childhood friend of the monarch. In its first year of operation, the department "received 52,000 complaints and dismissed 424 officials".

Prime Minister Ali Amini dissolved the organization in 1962 during a reduction in the size of government, but it was later reestablished in 1968. The IIO was abolished following the 1979 Iranian Revolution, but later reestablished as the Islamic Inspectorate Organization.

References

Inspectors general
Government of Iran
1959 establishments in Iran
1968 establishments in Iran
1979 disestablishments in Iran